CineVox Filmproduktion GmbH was a film and television production company based in Germany. It was founded in 1983 and went all the way until its closedown in 1999. Prior to its liquidation all rights were transferred to other companies within the CineVox Entertainment Group which has companies in Los Angeles, Munich and London.

Films and television series 
 The NeverEnding Story II: The Next Chapter
 Knight Moves
 Benefit of the Doubt
 The NeverEnding Story III
 The Neverending Story (co-production with Ellipse and Nelvana)
 The House with a Clock in Its Walls
 The Adventures of Pinocchio (co-production with New Line Cinema)

Film production companies of Germany
Mass media companies established in 1983
Mass media companies disestablished in 1999
Television production companies of Germany
German companies established in 1983
German companies disestablished in 1999